A Desperate Chance is a 1913 American silent short starring Earle Foxe and Alice Hollister. Directed by Kenean Buel, the drama features the same cast and crew of the film that preceded it that year, A Sawmill Hazard.

Cast
Alice Hollister
Earle Foxe
Helen Lindroth
Robert G. Vignola
Miriam Cooper

External links

1913 films
American black-and-white films
1913 drama films
American silent short films
Kalem Company films
Films directed by Kenean Buel
1913 short films
Silent American drama films
1910s American films